Kasaya is a Japanese surname. Notable people with the surname include:

Leonida Kasaya (born 1993), Kenyan volleyball player
Yukio Kasaya (born 1943), Japanese ski jumper

Japanese-language surnames